Pissed may refer to:

 Pissed (album), a 1994 album by Dangerous Toys, or the title track
 "Pissed", a 2018 song by Saweetie
 Pissed, past tense of piss or urinate

See also 
 Pissed off, slang for angry
 Pissed up, slang for intoxicated
 Piss (disambiguation)
 Pisser (disambiguation)